Arauco is a genus of moths in the family Geometridae.

Nacophorini
Geometridae genera